William Croome (1790–1860) was an American illustrator and wood engraver  in the 19th century. He trained with Abel Bowen in Boston, Massachusetts. Croome's work appeared in the American Magazine of Useful and Entertaining Knowledge (1830s), Lady's Annual (1830s), Crockett Almanac (ca.1840s), and in numerous children's books.

Works with illustrations by Croome
 The child's annual. Boston: Allen & Ticknor, 1834
 The Token and Atlantic Souvenir, 1836
 Caroline Howard Gilman. The Lady's annual register and housewife's memorandum book. Boston:  1837-1840.
 Crockett Almanac 1839. Containing Adventures, Exploits, Sprees & Scrapes in the West, & Life and Manners in the Backwoods. Nashville, Tennessee. Published by Ben Harding, 1838.
 John Stevens Cabot Abbott. The school-boy: or, A guide for youth to truth and duty. Boston: Crocker & Brewster, 1839.
 Jacob Abbott. Caleb in the country: A story for children. Boston: Crocker & Brewster, 1839
 Crockett Almanac Improved 1842. Boston. Printed and Published by S. N. Dickinson, 1841.
 John Frost. Book of the Navy. 1843
 John Frost. The pictorial history of the United States of America: from the discovery by the Northmen in the tenth century to the present time. ca.1843.  1852 ed. (Boston: H. Wentworth)
 John Frost. Panorama Of Nations. Auburn & Buffalo: John E. Beardsley, (1852).
 Graham's Magazine. Oct. 1844. Illustration to Charles J. Peterson's "The Pic-Nic: a Story of the Wissahicken." (Croome's interpretation described in 1983 by historian Burton Pollin: "simpering expressions and contrived postures, and ... overdressed characters")
 S.G. Goodrich. A pictorial natural history: embracing a view of the mineral, vegetable, and animal kingdoms; For the use of schools. Boston:  James Munroe & Company, 1845. New edition (1854).
 William Spottswood White. The African preacher: An authentic narrative. Philadelphia: Presbyterian Board of Publication, 1849
 Songs for the People. 1849
 Clara Moreton (Clara Jessup Moore) Frank and Fanny: a rural story. Boston: Phillips, Sampson, 1851
 Falconbridge. Dan. Marble: a biographical sketch of that famous and diverting humorist, with reminiscences, comicalities, anecdotes, etc., etc. New York: Dewitt & Davenport, 1851. Google books
 Godey's Lady's Book

Image gallery

References

External links

 
 
 New York Public Library. Images related to Croome
 Clio Visualizing History. Gregory M. Pfitzer. William Croome as Book Illustrator

1790 births
1860 deaths
19th century in Boston
American wood engravers
American illustrators
Davy Crockett
19th-century American artists
Artists from Boston